ZZ scale (1:300) is a model railroad scale with a standard gauge of . Models for the scale are produced exclusively by Bandai, and depict Japanese prototypes such as Shinkansen trains. To date, no other traditional scale railway support exists for the scale.  However the field of miniature war games has a large selection of buildings, trucks and other accessories at 1:285 scale and 1:300.  Several suppliers make these in painted and unpainted form, and at several levels of quality.

Until the 2006 announcement of T scale, ZZ scale was the smallest commercially available scale for model railroads.

See also
Z scale
 Rail transport modelling scales
 Model railway scales

Model railroad scales